The asterion is a meeting point between three sutures between bones of the skull. It is an important surgical landmark.

Structure 
In human anatomy, the asterion is a visible (craniometric) point on the exposed skull. It is just posterior to the ear. It is the point where three cranial sutures meet:
 the lambdoid suture.
 parietomastoid suture.
 occipitomastoid suture.

It is also the point where three cranial bones meet:
 the parietal bone.
 the occipital bone.
 the mastoid portion of the temporal bone.

In the adult, it lies 4 cm behind and 12 mm above the center of the entrance to the ear canal. Its relation to other anatomical structures is fairly variable.

Clinical significance 

Neurosurgeons may use the asterion to orient themselves, in order to plan safe entry into the skull for some operations, such as when using a retro-sigmoid approach. The asterion marks the junction of the transverse and the sigmoid sinuses

Etymology 
The asterion receives its name from the Greek ἀστέριον (astērion), meaning "star" or "starry".

The Mercedes point is an alternative term for the asterion, for its resemblance to the Mercedes-Benz logo.

References 

Human head and neck
Skull